In nuclear physics, secular equilibrium is a situation in which the quantity of a radioactive isotope remains constant because its production rate (e.g., due to decay of a parent isotope) is equal to its decay rate.

In radioactive decay

Secular equilibrium can occur in a radioactive decay chain only if the half-life of the daughter radionuclide B is much shorter than the half-life of the parent radionuclide A. In such a case, the decay rate of A and hence the production rate of B is approximately constant, because the half-life of A is very long compared to the time scales considered. The quantity of radionuclide B builds up until the number of B atoms decaying per unit time becomes equal to the number being produced per unit time. The quantity of radionuclide B then reaches a constant, equilibrium value. Assuming the initial concentration of radionuclide B is zero, full equilibrium usually takes several half-lives of radionuclide B to establish.

The quantity of radionuclide B when secular equilibrium is reached is determined by the quantity of its parent A and the half-lives of the two radionuclide. That can be seen from the time rate of change of the number of atoms of radionuclide B:

Secular equilibrium occurs when , or

Over long enough times, comparable to the half-life of radionuclide A, the secular equilibrium is only approximate; NA decays away according to

and the "equilibrium" quantity of radionuclide B declines in turn.  For times short compared to the half-life of A,  and the exponential can be approximated as 1.

See also
 Bateman equation
 Transient equilibrium

References
 IUPAC definition
 "secular equilibrium", IUPAC definition (IUPAC Compendium of Chemical Terminology 2nd Edition, 1997) 
 Radioactive Equilibrium, EPA definition
 Radioactive Equilibrium. An equilibrium as old as the Earth,  radioactivity.eu.com, IN2P3, EDP Science

Radioactivity